The World Amateur Go Championship (WAGC) is an international tournament for amateur Go players, held once a year since 1979. The organising body is the International Go Federation (IGF).

Each participating country sends one player, although in the beginning of the contest there were multiple players from the stronger Go Countries (e.g. China, Japan, South Korea); in 2007 there were 68 participants.

Some of the participants have gone on to become top Go professionals.

Past champions 
The names are ordered as Given name and Surname.

See also 
 Go competitions
 Go players
 List of top title holders in Go
 List of world championships in mind sports

References

External links 
 World Amateur Go Championship all detailed results
 Sensei's Library WAGC page
 Official website of 28th WAGC with detailed results
 Official website of the 29th WAGC
 Official website of the 30th WAGC
 Official website of the 31st WAGC
 Official website of the 32nd WAGC

International Go competitions
Go